Eva & Adam is a Swedish series of comics and books, started in 1990 by Johan Unenge and Måns Gahrton, primarily themed around romance and relationships. Set in present Sweden at school, the main characters are named after Adam and Eve in the Old Testament. The comic strip was published in Kamratposten between 1990–1993. The first comic album was released in 1993. Apart from comics, there has also been twelve books published, and two TV-series and a movie.

Comic albums
"Eva & Adam" (1993)
"Kyssar och svartsjuka" (1994) 
"Kramsnö och julkyssar" (1995)
"Den andra killen" (1996)
"Balla gänget" (1997)
"Adam ska flytta" (1998)
"Sommarlov" (1999)
"Fotboll,bugg och snedteg" (2000)
"Tjejsnack och killkris" (2001)
"Sällskapsresa i fel sällskap" (2002)
"Jag vill vara din" (2003)

Books
The books about Eva & Adam have been translated into six different languages (2008).

"Eva & Adam: En historia om plugget, kompisar och kärlek" (1995) 
"Eva & Adam: Att vara eller inte vara – ihop" (1996)
"Eva & Adam: Bästa ovänner" (1997) 
"Eva & Adam: Fusk och farligheter" (1998) 
"Eva & Adam: Jul jul pinsamma jul" (1999) 
"Eva & Adam: Sista pyjamaspartyt" (2000) 
"Eva & Adam: En midsommarnattsmardröm" (2001) 
"Eva & Adam: Inte som en dans" (2002)
"Eva & Adam: Prins eller vanlig groda" (2003)
"Eva & Adam: Solen skiner - sura miner" (2004)
"Eva & Adam: Rätt tjej och fel kille" (2005)
"Eva & Adam: Lyckliga idioter" (2007)
"Eva & Adam: Första ögonkastet" (2008)

References

Swedish comic strips
1990 comics debuts
1993 comics endings
Fictional Swedish people
Swedish comics characters
Comic strip duos
Child characters in comics
School-themed comics
Gag-a-day comics
Comics characters introduced in 1990
Comics about women
Female characters in comics
Comics set in Sweden
Comics adapted into television series
Swedish comics adapted into films